Càrn nan Gobhar is a mountain rising to  in the Northwest Highlands of Scotland. It lies north of Glen Strathfarrar and south of Glen Orrin, some 40 kilometres west of the city of Inverness. It is usually climbed along with the neighbouring Munros of Sgurr a' Choire Ghlais and Sgurr na Ruaidhe.

Somewhat confusingly there is another Càrn nan Gobhar, also a Munro with almost the same height, standing 14 kilometres to the south west, on the opposite side of Glen Strathfarrar.

References

Munros
Mountains and hills of the Northwest Highlands